Cyclophora cora is a moth in the  family Geometridae. It is found in New Guinea.

References

Moths described in 1920
Cyclophora (moth)
Moths of New Guinea